Pseudomyopia occurs when a spasm of the ciliary muscle prevents the eye from focusing in the distance, sometimes intermittently; this is different from myopia which is caused by the eye's shape or other basic anatomy. Pseudomyopia may be either organic, through stimulation of the parasympathetic nervous system, or functional in origin, through eye strain or fatigue of ocular systems. It is common in young adults who have active accommodation, and classically occurs after a change in visual requirements, such as students preparing for an exam, or a change in occupation.

Signs and symptoms
The following symptoms may be seen in patients with pseudomyopia
 Blurring of distance vision: Intermittent blurring of distant vision after prolonged near work is the main symptom of pseudomyopia.
 Asthenopia
 Headache
 Eyestrain
 Photophobia
 Esotropia: Acute onset esotropia may occur in accommodative spasm, which is the common cause of pseudomyopia. 
 Diplopia: Diplopia may occur due to esotropia or convergence spasm

The diagnosis is done by cycloplegic refraction using a strong cycloplegic like atropine or homatropine eye drops. Accommodative amplitude and facility may be reduced as a result of the ciliary muscle spasm.

Treatment
Treatment is dependent on the underlying aetiology. Organic causes may include systemic or ocular medications, brain stem injury, or active ocular inflammation such as uveitis. Functional pseudomyopia is managed though modification of working conditions, an updated refraction, typically involving a reduction of a myopic prescription to some lower myopic prescription, or through appropriate ocular exercises.

See also
Refraction

References

Eye diseases